Basie Plays Hefti is an album released by pianist, composer and bandleader Count Basie performing the compositions and arrangements of Neal Hefti recorded in 1958 and originally released on the Roulette label.

Reception

AllMusic awarded the album 4 out of 5 stars and its review by Scott Yanow states, "The Count Basie Orchestra was in top form for this set".

Track listing
All compositions by Neil Hefti
 "Has Anyone Here Seen Basie" - 2:42
 "Cute" - 3:10
 "Pensive Miss" - 3:48
 "Sloo Foot" - 3:08
 "It's Awf'ly Nice to Be With You" - 3:31
 "Scoot" - 2:28
 "A Little Tempo, Please" - 2:36
 "Late Date" - 3:17
 "Count Down" - 2:45
 "Bag'a Bones" - 2:42
 "Pony Tail" - 3:59

Personnel 
Count Basie - piano
Wendell Culley, Thad Jones, Joe Newman, Snooky Young - trumpet
Henry Coker, Al Grey, Benny Powell - trombone
Frank Wess, Marshal Royal - alto saxophone
Frank Foster, Billy Mitchell - tenor saxophone
Charlie Fowlkes - baritone saxophone
Freddie Green - guitar
Eddie Jones - bass
Sonny Payne - drums
Neal Hefti - arranger

References 

1958 albums
Count Basie Orchestra albums
Roulette Records albums
Albums arranged by Neal Hefti
Albums produced by Teddy Reig